The 2023 ProMX Motocross Championship season (known for sponsorship reasons as the Penrite ProMX Motocross Championship), is the third Australian Motocross Championship season under the ProMX moniker. 

The series includes eight rounds across four different states. All events except the fourth round and the final round will be a one-day format. 

Aaron Tanti is the reigning champion in the MX1 class, after winning his maiden title in 2022. In the MX2 class, Wilson Todd will be the defending champion, after he won his third class title in the previous season.

The start of the season was marred by the fatal crash of Brayden Erbacher at the opening round. The remaining races at Wonthaggi were cancelled as a result.

Race calendar and results

MX1

MX2

Circuit locations

MX1

Participants

Riders Championship
Points are awarded to finishers of the main races, in the following format:

{|
|

MX2

Participants

Riders Championship
Points are awarded to finishers of the main races, in the following format:

{|
|

References

ProMX Championship
Motocross Championship
ProMX Championship